The Star of the Solomon Islands, established in 1981 is the highest honour of the Solomon Islands. Queen Elizabeth II was the first recipient in 1982. Recipients are entitled to use the post-nominal letters SSI.

This award is placed by the Court of St James's (the royal court for the Sovereign of the United Kingdom) immediately above the Knight/Dame Grand Cross of the Most Excellent Order of the British Empire. It is primarily awarded to heads of state and other important international leaders. No Solomon Islander holds this award.

Recipients
Notable recipients include:
 Helen Clark  (former Prime Minister of New Zealand)
 John Howard  (former Prime Minister of Australia) 
 Sir Michael Somare  (former Prime Minister of Papua New Guinea)
 Prince Richard, Duke of Gloucester

References

wawards.org

Orders, decorations, and medals of the Solomon Islands
Orders of chivalry awarded to heads of state, consorts and sovereign family members
Awards established in 1981
1981 establishments in the Solomon Islands